"Broadway" is a song recorded by the Goo Goo Dolls. The song was released in March 2000 as the last single from their sixth studio album, Dizzy Up the Girl (1998). Although not as popular as the albums previous singles "Iris" and "Slide", the song still managed to hit number 24 on the US Billboard Hot 100 and number 84 on the Billboard year-end Hot 100 singles of 2000. The single also peaked number 7 on the Canadian RPM Top Singles chart and number 6 on the Icelandic Singles Chart.

Content
The song refers to the Broadway-Filmore neighborhood of Buffalo, New York, a lower income, working-class neighborhood in which songwriter John Rzeznik grew up. It also describes Rzeznik's difficult relationship with his alcoholic father, who died when Rzeznik was 15, and the "cycle of destruction" that he witnessed in the neighborhood. The lyrics "See the young man sittin' in the old man's bar / Waitin' for his turn to die" specifically refers to a common occurrence he saw in the bar he and his father frequented:

Track listings
German maxi-CD single
 "Broadway" (album version)
 "Naked" (live version)
 "Black Balloon" (live version)

Australian maxi-CD single
 "Broadway" – 3:57
 "Black Balloon" – 4:11
 "Slide" – 3:32
 "Naked" (live) – 3:55
 "Black Balloon" (live) – 3:42

Charts

Weekly charts

Year-end charts

Release history

References

1998 songs
2000 singles
Culture of Buffalo, New York
Goo Goo Dolls songs
Song recordings produced by Rob Cavallo
Songs about alcohol
Songs about fathers
Songs written by John Rzeznik
Warner Records singles